Elemental phosphorus can exist in several allotropes, the most common of which are white and red solids. Solid violet and black allotropes are also known. Gaseous phosphorus exists as diphosphorus and atomic phosphorus.

White phosphorus

White phosphorus, yellow phosphorus or simply tetraphosphorus exists as molecules made up of four atoms in a tetrahedral structure. The tetrahedral arrangement results in ring strain and instability. The molecule is described as consisting of six single P–P bonds. Two crystalline forms are known. The α form is defined as the standard state of the element, but is actually metastable under standard conditions. It has a body-centered cubic crystal structure, and transforms reversibly into the β form at 195.2 K. The β form is believed to have a hexagonal crystal structure.

White phosphorus is a translucent waxy solid that quickly becomes yellow when exposed to light. For this reason it is also called yellow phosphorus. It glows greenish in the dark (when exposed to oxygen) and is highly flammable and pyrophoric (self-igniting) upon contact with air. It is toxic, causing severe liver damage on ingestion and phossy jaw from chronic ingestion or inhalation. The odour of combustion of this form has a characteristic garlic smell, and samples are commonly coated with white "diphosphorus pentoxide", which consists of  tetrahedral with oxygen inserted between the phosphorus atoms and at their vertices. White phosphorus is only slightly soluble in water and can be stored under water. Indeed, white phosphorus is safe from self-igniting only when it is submerged in water; due to this, unreacted white phosphorus can prove hazardous to beachcombers who may collect washed-up samples while unaware of their true nature.  is soluble in benzene, oils, carbon disulfide, and disulfur dichloride.

Production and applications 
The white allotrope can be produced using several methods. In the industrial process, phosphate rock is heated in an electric or fuel-fired furnace in the presence of carbon and silica. Elemental phosphorus is then liberated as a vapour and can be collected under phosphoric acid. An idealized equation for this carbothermal reaction is shown for calcium phosphate (although phosphate rock contains substantial amounts of fluoroapatite):

White phosphorus has an appreciable vapour pressure at ordinary temperatures. The vapour density indicates that the vapour is composed of  molecules up to about 800 °C. Above that temperature, dissociation into  molecules occurs.

Phosphorus reacts with oxygen, usually forming two oxides depending on the amount available oxygen:  (phosphorus trioxide) when reacted with a limited supply of oxygen, and  when reacted with excess oxygen. This combustion gives phosphorus(V) oxide:

Because of this property, white phosphorus is used as a weapon.

Non-existence of cubic-
Although white phosphorus converts to the thermodynamically more stable red allotrope, the formation of the cubic- molecule is not observed in the condensed phase. Analogs of this hypothetical molecule have been prepared from phosphaalkynes. White phosphorus in the gaseous state and as waxy solid consists of reactive  molecules.

Red phosphorus

Red phosphorus exists as an amorphous network. Upon further heating, the amorphous red phosphorus crystallizes.

Under standard conditions it is more stable than white phosphorus, but less stable than the thermodynamically stable black phosphorus. The standard enthalpy of formation of red phosphorus is −17.6 kJ/mol. Red phosphorus is kinetically most stable.

It was first presented by Anton von Schrötter before the Vienna Academy of Sciences on December 9, 1847, although others had doubtless had this substance in their hands before, such as Berzelius.

Applications 
Red phosphorus can be used as a very effective flame retardant, especially in thermoplastics (e.g. polyamide) and thermosets (e.g. epoxy resins or polyurethanes). The flame retarding effect is based on the formation of polyphosphoric acid. Together with the organic polymer material, these acids create a char that prevents the propagation of the flames. The safety risks associated with phosphine generation and friction sensitivity of red phosphorus can be effectively minimized by stabilization and micro-encapsulation. For easier handling, red phosphorus is often used in form of dispersions or masterbatches in various carrier systems. However, for electronic/electrical systems, red phosphorus flame retardant has been effectively banned by major OEMs due to its tendency to induce premature failures. One persistent problem is that red phosphorus in epoxy molding compounds induces elevated leakage current in semiconductor devices. Another problem was acceleration of hydrolysis reactions in PBT insulating material.

Red phosphorus can also be used in the illicit production of methamphetamine and Krokodil.

Red phosphorus can be used as an elemental photocatalyst for hydrogen formation from the water. They display a steady hydrogen evolution rates of 633 μmol/(h⋅g) by the formation of small-sized fibrous phosphorus.

Violet or Hittorf's phosphorus

Monoclinic phosphorus, or violet phosphorus, is also known as Hittorf's metallic phosphorus. In 1865, Johann Wilhelm Hittorf heated red phosphorus in a sealed tube at 530 °C. The upper part of the tube was kept at 444 °C. Brilliant opaque monoclinic, or rhombohedral, crystals sublimed as a result. Violet phosphorus can also be prepared by dissolving white phosphorus in molten lead in a sealed tube at 500 °C for 18 hours. Upon slow cooling, Hittorf's allotrope crystallises out. The crystals can be revealed by dissolving the lead in dilute nitric acid followed by boiling in concentrated hydrochloric acid. In addition, a fibrous form exists with similar phosphorus cages. The lattice structure of violet phosphorus was presented by Thurn and Krebs in 1969. Imaginary frequencies, indicating the irrationalities or instabilities of the structure, were obtained for the reported violet structure from 1969. The single crystal of violet phosphorus was also produced. The lattice structure of violet phosphorus has been obtained by single‐crystal x‐ray diffraction to be monoclinic with space group of P2/n (13) (a = 9.210, b = 9.128, c = 21.893 Å, β = 97.776°, CSD-1935087). The optical band gap of the violet phosphorus was measured by diffuse reflectance spectroscopy to be around 1.7 eV. The thermal decomposition temperature was 52 °C higher than its black phosphorus counterpart. The violet phosphorene was easily obtained from both mechanical and solution exfoliation.

Reactions of violet phosphorus
It does not ignite in air until heated to 300 °C and is insoluble in all solvents. It is not attacked by alkali and only slowly reacts with halogens. It can be oxidised by nitric acid to phosphoric acid.

If it is heated in an atmosphere of inert gas, for example nitrogen or carbon dioxide, it sublimes and the vapour condenses as white phosphorus. If it is heated in a vacuum and the vapour condensed rapidly, violet phosphorus is obtained. It would appear that violet phosphorus is a polymer of high relative molecular mass, which on heating breaks down into  molecules. On cooling, these would normally dimerize to give  molecules (i.e. white phosphorus) but, in a vacuum, they link up again to form the polymeric violet allotrope.

Black phosphorus

Black phosphorus is the thermodynamically stable form of phosphorus at room temperature and pressure, with a heat of formation of −39.3 kJ/mol (relative to white phosphorus which is defined as the standard state). It was first synthesized by heating white phosphorus under high pressures (12,000 atmospheres) in 1914. As a 2D material, in appearance, properties, and structure, black phosphorus is very much like graphite with both being black and flaky, a conductor of electricity, and having puckered sheets of linked atoms.

Black phosphorus has an orthorhombic pleated honeycomb structure and is the least reactive allotrope, a result of its lattice of interlinked six-membered rings where each atom is bonded to three other atoms. In this structure, each phosphorus atom has five outer shell electrons. Black and red phosphorus can also take a cubic crystal lattice structure. The first high-pressure synthesis of black phosphorus crystals was made by the Nobel prize winner Percy Williams Bridgman in 1914. Metal salts catalyze the synthesis of black phosphorus.

Phosphorene

The similarities to graphite also include the possibility of scotch-tape delamination (exfoliation), resulting in phosphorene, a graphene-like 2D material with excellent charge transport properties, thermal transport properties and optical properties. Distinguishing features of scientific interest include a thickness dependent band-gap, which is not found in graphene. This, combined with a high on/off ratio of ~105 makes phosphorene a promising candidate for field-effect transistors (FETs). The tunable bandgap also suggests promising applications in mid-infrared photodetectors and LEDs. Exfoliated black phosphorus sublimes at 400 °C in vacuum. It gradually oxidizes when exposed to water in the presence of oxygen, which is a concern when contemplating it as a material for the manufacture of transistors, for example. Exfoliated black phosphorus is an emerging anode material in the battery community, showing high stability and lithium storage.

Ring-shaped phosphorus
Ring-shaped phosphorus was theoretically predicted in 2007. The ring-shaped phosphorus was self-assembled inside evacuated multi-walled carbon nanotubes with inner diameters of 5–8 nm using a vapor encapsulation method. A ring with a diameter of 5.30 nm, consisting of 23  and 23  units with a total of 230 P atoms, was observed inside a multi-walled carbon nanotube with an inner diameter of 5.90 nm in atomic scale. The distance between neighboring rings is 6.4 Å.

The  ring shaped molecule is not stable in isolation.

Blue phosphorus
Single-layer blue phosphorus was first produced in 2016 by the method of molecular beam epitaxy from black phosphorus as precursor.

Diphosphorus

In 2006, the diatomic molecule was generated in homogeneous solution under normal conditions with the use of transition metal complexes (for example, tungsten and niobium).

At temperatures above about 2000 °C, the diphosphorus molecule begins to dissociate into atomic phosphorus.

Phosphorus nanorods
 nanorod polymers were isolated from CuI-P complexes using low temperature treatment.

Red/brown phosphorus was shown to be stable in air for several weeks and have properties distinct from those of red phosphorus. Electron microscopy showed that red/brown phosphorus forms long, parallel nanorods with a diameter between 3.4 Å and 4.7 Å.

Properties

See also
Phossy jaw

References

External links
White phosphorus
 White Phophorus at The Periodic Table of Videos (University of Nottingham)
 More about White Phosphorus (and phosphorus pentoxide) at The Periodic Table of Videos (University of Nottingham)
The Chemistry of Phosphorus at Chemistry LibreTexts.

Phosphorus
Phosphorus